On January 14, 1822, Solomon Van Rensselaer (DR) of  resigned to accept a position as Postmaster of Albany.  A special election was held February 25–27, 1822.

Election results

Rensselaer took his seat on March 12, 1822.

See also
List of special elections to the United States House of Representatives

References

New York 09
1822
New York 1822 09
1822 New York (state) elections
United States House of Representatives 1822 09
New York 09